This is a timeline showing surrenders of the various fighting groups of the Axis forces that also marked ending time of World War II:

Table of surrenders

Number of soldiers surrendering

References 

World War II surrender of Axis forces
Chronology of World War II